De Ronde Venen is a municipality in the Netherlands, in the province of Utrecht. On 1 January 2011, the municipality of Abcoude was amalgamated into De Ronde Venen.

Population centres 
The municipality of De Ronde Venen consists of the villages Abcoude, Amstelhoek, De Hoef, Baambrugge, Mijdrecht, Vinkeveen, Waverveen, and Wilnis, and a number of hamlets, such as Aan de Zuwe, Achterbos, and Stokkelaarsbrug.

Topography

Dutch Topographic map of the municipality of De Ronde Venen, June 2015

Notable people 

 Jan van Almeloveen (1656 in Mijdrecht – 1684) a Dutch painter, engraver and draughtsman
 Theodorus Janssonius van Almeloveen (1657 in Mijdrecht – 1712) a Dutch physician and medical editor
 Jan Willem Pieneman (1779 in Abcoude – 1853) a painter
 Werenfried van Straaten (1913 in Mijdrecht – 2003) a Dutch Roman Catholic priest and social activist
 Hans van Vliet (born 1949 in Mijdrecht) a Dutch computer scientist and academic
 Michaël Dudok de Wit (born 1953 in Abcoude) a Dutch animator, director and illustrator 
 Saskia Rao-de Haas (born 1971 in Abcoude) a virtuoso cellist and composer

Sport 
 Jan Grijseels (1890 in Abcoude-Proosdij – 1961) a Dutch track and field athlete, who competed in the 1912 Summer Olympics 
 Gerard Maarse (1929 in Wilnis – 1989) a Dutch speed skater, competed in the 1952 & 1956 Winter Olympics
 Christine Aaftink (born 1966 in Abcoude) a retired speed skater, competed at the 1988, 1992 and 1994 Winter Olympics
 Tom Cordes (born 1966 in Wilnis) a retired Dutch cyclist, competed at the 1988 Summer Olympics
 Nicolien Sauerbreij (born 1979 in De Hoef) a Dutch professional snowboarder, competed in the 2002 & 2006 Winter Olympic Games and was a gold medal in the 2010 Winter Olympics 
 Ivo Snijders (born 1980 in Mijdrecht) a rower, competed in the 2004 & 2008 Summer Olympics

Gallery

References

External links

Official website

 
Municipalities of Utrecht (province)